The Women's Shot Put athletics events for the 2012 Summer Paralympics took place at the London Olympic Stadium from September 1 to September 8, 2012. A total of 9 events were contested incorporating 16 different classifications.

Schedule

Results

F11/12

F20

F32–34

F35/36

F37

F40

F42/44

F54–56

F57/58

References

Athletics at the 2012 Summer Paralympics
2012 in women's athletics
Women's sport in London